is a common name for Japanese communities in cities and towns outside Japan.

History

Emigration from Japan first happened and was recorded as early as the 12th century to the Philippines, but did not become a mass phenomenon until the Meiji Era, when Japanese began to go to the Philippines, North America, and beginning in 1897 with 35 emigrants to Mexico;  and later to Peru, beginning in 1899 with 790 emigrants. There was also significant emigration to the territories of the Empire of Japan during the colonial period; however, most such emigrants repatriated to Japan after the end of World War II in Asia.

For a brief period in the 16th–17th centuries, Japanese overseas activity and presence in Southeast Asia and elsewhere in the region boomed. Sizeable Japanese communities, known as Nihonmachi, could be found in many of the major ports and political centers of the region, where they exerted significant political and economic influence.

The Japanese had been active on the seas and across the region for centuries, traveling for commercial, political, religious and other reasons. The 16th century, however, saw a dramatic increase in such travel and activity. The internal strife of the Sengoku period caused a great many people, primarily samurai, commoner merchants, and Christian refugees to seek their fortunes across the seas. Many of the samurai who fled Japan around this time were those who stood on the losing sides of various major conflicts; some were rōnin, some veterans of the Japanese invasions of Korea or of various other major conflicts. As Toyotomi Hideyoshi and later the Tokugawa shōguns issued repeated bans on Christianity, many fled the country; a significant portion of those settled in Catholic Manila.

In western countries such as Canada and the United States, the Japanese tended to integrate with society so that many if not all Japantowns are in danger of completely disappearing, with the remaining only existing in San Francisco and San Jose, California.

Characteristics
The features described below are characteristic of many modern Japantowns.

Japanese architectural styles

Many historical Japantowns will exhibit architectural styles that reflect the Japanese culture.  Japanese architecture has traditionally been typified by wooden structures, elevated slightly off the ground, with tiled or thatched roofs. Sliding doors (fusuma) were used in place of walls, allowing the internal configuration of a space to be customized for different occasions. People usually sat on cushions or otherwise on the floor, traditionally; chairs and high tables were not widely used until the 20th century. Since the 19th century, however, Japan has incorporated much of Western, modern, and post-modern architecture into construction and design.

Japanese language

Many Japantowns will exhibit the use of the Japanese language in signage existing on road signs and on buildings as Japanese is the official and primary language of Japan. Japanese has a lexically distinct pitch-accent system. Early Japanese is known largely on the basis of its state in the 8th century, when the three major works of Old Japanese were compiled. The earliest attestation of the Japanese language is in a Chinese document from 252 AD.

Japanese is written with a combination of three scripts: hiragana, derived from the Chinese cursive script, katakana, derived as a shorthand from Chinese characters, and kanji, imported from China. The Latin alphabet, rōmaji, is also often used in modern Japanese, especially for company names and logos, advertising, and when inputting Japanese into a computer. The Hindu–Arabic numerals are generally used for numbers, but traditional Sino–Japanese numerals are also common.

Locations

Americas
Japantowns were created because of the widespread immigration of Japanese to America in the Meiji period (1868–1912). At that time, many Japanese were poor and sought economic opportunities in the United States. Japanese immigrants initially settled in Western parts of the US and Canada.

At one time, there were 43 different Japantowns in California, ranging from several square blocks of Little Tokyo in Los Angeles, to one in the small farming community of Marysville in Yuba County. Besides typical businesses, these communities usually had Japanese language schools for the immigrants' children, Japanese language newspapers, Buddhist and Christian churches, and sometimes Japanese hospitals. After the World War II internment of the Japanese, most of those communities declined significantly or disappeared altogether.

There are currently four recognized Japantowns left in the United States, which are facing issues such as commercialization, reconstruction, gentrification and dwindling Japanese populations.

Argentina

 Colonia Urquiza is the Japanese district in La Plata, Argentina. Colonia Urquiza is the largest Japanese district in Argentina, and concentrates many institutions such as schools, restaurants and training centers.

Brazil

 Liberdade is the Japanese district in São Paulo, Brazil. São Paulo metropolitan area is the city that has the largest Japanese population outside Japan and the largest population of people that have Japanese descent.

Canada

Several Japantowns emerged in the British Columbia's Lower Mainland during the early 20th century, including Japantown, Vancouver. Steveston in Richmond, British Columbia was another community whose population in 1942 was primarily made up of people of Japanese descent.  However, these communities were dispersed after Japanese Canadians were interned during World War II.

In the early 21st century, a Little Japan has emerged around Bay and Dundas Street in Toronto, Ontario.

Canadian municipalities with Japanese populations higher than the national average (0.3%) include:
 Richmond, British Columbia (2%)
 Lethbridge, Alberta (1.9%) 
 Burnaby, British Columbia (1.7%)
 Vancouver, British Columbia (1.7%)
 North Vancouver, British Columbia (1.6%)
 North Vancouver (district municipality), British Columbia (1.5%)
 Port Coquitlam, British Columbia (1.4%)
 West Vancouver, British Columbia (1.2%)
 Coquitlam, British Columbia (1%)
 Kamloops, British Columbia
 Port Moody, British Columbia (1%)
 Calgary, Alberta (0.6%) - 29 Street SW 
 Richmond Hill, Ontario (0.5%)
 Toronto, Ontario (0.5%)
 Markham, Ontario (0.4%)

Mexico

 Little Tokyo, Cuauhtémoc, Mexico City this neighborhood in the Cuauhtémoc district is home to many Japanese establishments from restaurants, ramen houses, Japanese bars, Japanese book stores, Japanese hotels and many other businesses catering to the Japanese community in the city as well as to the locals and tourists. Future plans for the neighborhood include a welcoming torii and Japanese style lanterns along the streets on Little Tokyo as designation markers of the "Barrio Japonés" and many other cultural markers. 
Aguilas, Mexico City neighborhood in Mexico City. This part of the city is home to many Mexicans of Japanese origin.. Japanese clubs and restaurants as well as the japanese gardens. This area was mainly settled by many Japanese during WWII as the Mexican government concentrated many Japanese nationals in this area. Today it is a thriving part of the city with many Japanese institutions for the Nikkei community. 
Acacoyagua, Chiapas. Acacoyagua is to this day the oldest Japanese colony in Latin America. It is a colony from the late 1800's where Japan sent off citizens to populate other parts of the world because of overpopulation at the time. The Enomoto Colony tried to farm coffee seeing the success of the neighboring German colonies in the Soconusco region. The colony prospered and to this day maintains their Japanese identity in the region. A Torii has been erected to welcome visitors as many institutions and buildings have Japanese cultural markers, especially in the Central Park. The descendants are very proud of their culture and have very strong ties to Japan, including welcoming the Crown Prince of Japan And Japanese festivals.

Peru

 Neighborhood around the Peruvian Japanese Cultural Center in Jesús María District, Lima

United States

 Japan Marketplace, Columbus, Ohio
 Little Tokyo, Los Angeles, California
 Sawtelle Japantown, Los Angeles, California
 Japantown, San Francisco, California
 Japantown, San Jose, California
 International District in Seattle, Washington

Concentrated and historical Japanese populations in the United States
Northern California: In addition to Japantown districts in San Francisco and San Jose, suburbs and neighborhoods with significant Japanese American populations and/or histories include:
 Alameda, California (1.1%) 
 Berkeley, California (1.6%)
 Fresno, California area.
 Hayward, California (0.5%)
 Livingston, California
 Lower Haight, San Francisco, California
 Mountain View, California (2.1%) 
 Oakland, California (0.5%)
 Palo Alto, California (2.0%) 
 Sacramento, California - this city also has a Chinatown, also Japanese presence in Florin, California.
 San Mateo, California (2.2%)
 Salinas, California
 Santa Clara, California (1.5%)
 South San Francisco, California
 Sunnyvale, California
 Walnut Creek, California
 Watsonville, California (0.8%)
 Woodland, California

Southern California:
 Duarte, California
 Fontana, California
 Gardena, California
 Long Beach, California (0.6%)
 Orange County, California
 Oxnard, California
 Palm Desert, California (Coachella-Imperial valleys).
 San Bernardino, California (Inland Empire and Riverside area).
 Sawtelle Boulevard, West Los Angeles, Los Angeles, California
 Torrance, California - Called "the Japanese 47th prefecture".
 Vista, California (North county-San Diego area)
 Historic Wintersburg in Huntington Beach, California

Pacific Islands:

 Honolulu, Hawaii - this city also has a Chinatown

Elsewhere in western U.S.
 Lower Colorado River Valley, Arizona

 Sakura Square, Denver, Colorado - this city also has a Chinatown.
 Grand Avenue, Phoenix, Arizona (east end of the road).
 Las Vegas, Nevada - Many are from Hawaii.
 Ontario, Oregon (1.6%)
 Portland, Oregon - this city also has a Chinatown
 Japantown Street, Salt Lake City, Utah - this city also has a Chinatown

Eastern U.S.:
 North Side, Chicago and Northwestern Chicago metro area, Illinois
 Boston, Massachusetts
 Porter Square, Cambridge, Massachusetts
 Quincy, Massachusetts
 Novi, Michigan near Detroit
 Seabrook, New Jersey
 St. Mark's Place, East Village, New York City (there are 150,000 Japanese in NYC). 
 Westchester County, New York (i.e. Scarsdale - largest Asian-American town in New York state).
 Dublin, Ohio
 Northern Virginia

Asia

China

 Gubei, Shanghai, a residential area which has many expatriates from Japan. It is informally referred to as a "Little Tokyo." There is a Takashimaya department store in Gubei.

 Eastern District, Hong Kong is the home to the largest Japanese community in Hong Kong, where it is widely distributed in district such as Taikoo Shing, with nearly a quarter of total Japanese in Hong Kong. The Hong Kong Japanese School is also settled their headquarter in Eastern district.
More than 50 percent of Kowloon Japanese residents live in Hung Hom in Kowloon City District, as one of the most popular area in Hong Kong for Japanese, it is called as "Little Japan" or Hong Kong's "Shitamachi (Japanese: 下町) when there is great concentration with Japanese restaurants with traditional style.
Furthermore, there is also a Japanese school campus in Tai Po area in the New Territories.

India

 Sataku, Haldia

Malaysia

In the late 2000s, Malaysia began to become a popular destination for Japanese retirees. Malaysia My Second Home retirement programme received 513 Japanese applicants from 2002 until 2006. Motivations for choosing Malaysia include the low cost of real-estate and of hiring home care workers. Such retirees sometimes refer to themselves ironically as economic migrants or even economic refugees, referring to the fact that they could not afford as high a quality of life in retirement, or indeed to retire at all, were they still living in Japan.

 Mont Kiara, Kuala Lumpur
 Little Japan, Taman Molek, Johor Bahru
 Jalan Bendahara, Ipoh
 Jalan Air Itam, Penang

Philippines

 Japantown, Makati Philippines at Top of The Glo Glorietta Mall
 Japantown, Paco, Manila, Philippines
 Japantown, Iloilo City, Philippines
 Japantown, Cebu City, Philippines
 Japantown, Mandaue City, Philippines
 Japantown, Davao City, Philippines
 Little Tokyo, Davao City, Philippines
 Little Tokyo, Makati, Philippines. This Japanese neighborhood can be found along the stretch of Chino Roces Avenue and neighboring streets in the area approximately between Rufino Street and Arnaiz Avenue.
 Mintal, Barangay in Davao City, Philippines known as Little Tokyo.
 Little Kyoto, Cebu City, Philippines

Singapore

 Clarke Quay
 Orchard Road

South Korea
 Yongsan District, Seoul

Taiwan
 Tianmu, Taipei, Taiwan
 Linsen North Road, Taipei, Taiwan

Vietnam

 Le Thanh Ton Street, District 1, Ho Chi Minh City.

Concentrated and historical Japanese populations in Asia

Indonesia

 Parts of Jakarta's shopping district of Blok M has been developed into the formation of Japanese-oriented facilities, including clusters of restaurants, spas, and cafés; earning the nickname "Little Tokyo", as it is also coupled with the high density of Japanese expats living around the area.

Pakistan

 There is an active Japanese presence (including multinational companies and expatriates) in industrial areas of Karachi, such as Port Qasim. During the 1980s and 1990s, there were over 2,000 Japanese living in Karachi, making them one of the significant expatriate communities in the country. Now, the community has shrunk to a few hundred. There is also a Karachi Japanese School.

Thailand

 In Bangkok a Japanese population lives in and around Sukhumvit Road, Thong Lo and Phrompong. Many of the apartment complexes are rented solely to Japanese people (although they are owned by Thais), and there are Japanese grocery shops, restaurants, bars, dry cleaning, clubs, etc. in and around Phrompong.
 In Si Racha a Japanese population lives in and around the city center as the second largest Japanese community outside Bangkok.
 In Chiangmai a Japanese population lives around the city center as the popular place for Japanese retirees with good weather and less crowded city.
 In Ayutthaya a growing number of Japanese population returns and lives in and around Rojana Road close to many Japanese companies, the city also well known place of the first Japanese quarter in Thailand dated back to 16th century, the Ban Yipun.

Europe

Germany
 Düsseldorf has one of the largest Japanese population in Germany. The Japanese community of Düsseldorf grew from an area nearby Düsseldorf Central Station nicknamed "Little Tokyo", where Japanese offices and stores are concentrated.

United Kingdom

 London is home to the largest Japanese community in the United Kingdom, with Acton and Finchley having the higher concentrations of Japanese residents. North London is a popular area in London for Japanese residents to live.

France

 Paris has a Japanese community. Its Japanese restaurants and shops are concentrated near the Opéra Garnier (especially on Rue Sainte-Anne) and the city's Japanese population is largely concentrated in 15th arrondissement and 16th arrondissement.

Spain

Since the late 1970s-early 1980s many Japanese companies chose Spain to set themselves.

The Netherlands
 Amstelveen
 Buitenveldert

Oceania

Australia

 Little Tokyo, Adelaide
 Japantown, Darwin
 Artarmon, Sydney has a small Japantown by the railway station, containing Japanese restaurants, Japanese grocery stores and a Japanese bookshop. Nearby suburbs such as Northbridge and St Leonards also have a number of Japanese businesses. - this city also has a Chinatown
 Gold Coast, Queensland has a big Japanese population which is still rising. - this city also has a Chinatown

See also
 Chinatown
 Koreatown
 Ethnic enclave
 Japanese diaspora
 Little Saigon
 Little Manila
 List of named ethnic enclaves in North American cities
 List of named ethnic enclaves in Philippine cities

References

External links
 
 Japantown Atlas The Japantown Atlas maps nearly two dozen communities in California where Japanese Americans lived and worked prior to World War II.
 California Japantowns
 Map of Little Tokyo Japantown, Los Angeles
 Little Tokyo Japantown Guide
 Sawtelle Blvd. (West L.A.) 
 Nijiya Market Locations (may give a hint as to the locations of Japanese populations in California)
 Arnold, Bruce Makoto. "The Japanese Ethnopole as Determinant: The Effects of the Japantowns on Second-Generation Japanese-Americans."